The 2010–11 Texas Longhorns men's basketball team represented the University of Texas in the 2010–11 NCAA Division I men's basketball season. Their head coach was Rick Barnes, who was in his 13th year. The team played its home games at the Frank Erwin Center in Austin, Texas and are members of the Big 12 Conference. They finished the season 28–8, 13–3 in Big 12 play and lost in the championship game of the 2011 Big 12 men's basketball tournament to Kansas. They received an at-large bid in the 2011 NCAA Division I men's basketball tournament where they defeated Oakland in the second round before falling in the third round to Arizona.

Recruiting

Source:

Schedule

Source:

|-
!colspan=9 style=| Regular season

 

|-
!colspan=9 style=| Big 12 tournament

|-
!colspan=9 style=|<span style=>NCAA tournament

Rankings

Roster

References

Texas
Texas Longhorns men's basketball seasons
Texas
2010 in sports in Texas
2011 in sports in Texas